Suavodrillia kennicotti is a species of sea snail, a marine gastropod mollusk in the family Borsoniidae.

Description
The size of an adult shell varies between 9 mm and 40 mm. The solid shell is white, with traces of thin yellowish epidermis. There are no longitudinal ribs. The outer lip is deeply excavated below the suture. The margin is thin and the sharp columella is twisted.

Distribution
This species occurs in the Pacific Ocean between Alaska and Taiwan

References

 Dall, 1871. Descriptions of sixty new forms of molluscs from the West Coast of North America and the North Pacific Ocean, with notes on others already described.

External links
 
 Smithsonian Institution: holotype

kennicotti
Gastropods described in 1871